The Awakening is a South African gothic rock band founded in Johannesburg in 1995 by vocalist, songwriter, multi-instrumentalist, and producer Ashton Nyte. The sound has been described as a hybrid of gothic rock, darkwave, gothic metal, industrial rock, and new wave – a combination that was loosely described by Nyte in 1999 as "dark future rock." The Awakening has released eleven studio albums, several singles, EPs, and two greatest hits compilations in total. As of 2009, The Awakening has been based in the United States.

The Awakening is credited in the press as "South Africa's most successful gothic rock act and one of the top bands in the far broader alternative scene."
The Awakening has had top charting radio singles and club rotation throughout South Africa, Europe, and the US and became the first gothic rock band to ever headline major national festivals throughout South Africa, including Oppikoppi and RAMfest, and has performed to crowds of over 30,000.

History

Early years – Risen
Guitarist-vocalist Ashton Nyte began his musical career as frontman for the South African rock band Martyr's Image, formed in early 1994. In 1995, Nyte asked Martyr's Image bassist Jenni Hazell and guitarist Philip Booyens to join him in his new project, which was tentatively titled "Children of the Torch" but later changed to "The Awakening" just prior to their first show in February 1996.

Immediately following The Awakening's first performance, Nyte began production of his first studio album, Risen. The album was recorded at Mega Music Studios in Johannesburg with producer Leon Erasmus. More concerts followed, and amidst a steady schedule of shows Nyte returned to the studio to record his cover of the Simon and Garfunkel song "The Sounds of Silence." The single went to No. 1 on South Africa's rock charts and became a cult classic for South African rock.

The Awakening became both immediately famous throughout South Africa and the focal point of much controversy due to the dark stylings and sound.

Request
The Awakening's second album, Request, embraced the electronic and industrial sounds of 1980s new romantic movement. The Awakening began to achieve even more notice in the mainstream radio and media with the singles "Maree", "Rain" and "Before I Leap." Maree as a single sold over 5,000 copies in its first year without major label support and also went to #1 on the South African rock charts. The Awakening's first music video was shot for "Rain" by director Katinka Harrod. The video was shot in the middle of winter, which posed a unique and potentially dangerous challenge for Nyte, who performed under icy water during filming, was painted black in body paint, and hosed clean for other scenes. The video brought more public exposure and was aired on several music shows throughout Africa.

In November 1998, Ashton Nyte launched his own independent record label, Intervention Arts, and reissued the two previous Awakening albums as remastered editions with bonus tracks and new layouts. The albums were picked up by US and German distributors, and as a result, The Awakening quickly built an international fan base. The hit single Rain was picked up in the US and featured on various radio stations and cd compilations.

Ethereal Menace
With a new five-member live lineup, Nyte created The Awakening's third album, Ethereal Menace, which utilizes elements of industrial music. This style was later dubbed as "dark future rock". Ethereal Menace was released in July 1999, and achieved an enthusiastic reception: the single "The March" was successful and another music video was produced by South African Music Awards winner, director Eban Olivier's Concrete Productions, and the video was placed in rotation on MTV Europe.

The Fourth Seal of Zeen
In December 1999, Nyte took a break from The Awakening to concentrate on releasing his first solo album, The Slender Nudes. Nyte returned to The Awakening in September 2000, when he released The Fourth Seal of Zeen. The album displays a range of sounds between darkwave and classic gothic rock. The song "The Dark Romantics" became a gothic club dance floor anthem throughout the world and remains one of the band's most well-known singles to date. In the year 2001, the EP The Fountain was released, which echoed the atmosphere and style of Zeen. The Fountain single went to No. 4 on the South African rock charts, and charted in the top 10 for nine weeks. Nyte also released his second solo album, Dirt Sense, in 2002, which spent 17 weeks in South Africa's charts topping out at No. 2.

Roadside Heretics
In June 2002, Nyte recorded The Awakening's most aggressive, guitar-driven album to date, Roadside Heretics. Garrick van der Tuin replaced Glenn Welman as a live drummer, which influenced the harsher sounds heard on the album. Thematically, Roadside Heretics deals with a discriminated-against and isolated people – a subject well known to South Africa. According to Nyte, Roadside Heretics marked a new era for The Awakening, as he focused on capturing the trademark live performance intensity within the album's sound. One of the album's singles, The Maker spent two weeks at No. 1 on the South African rock charts. In the same year, the compilation album Sacrificial Etchings was released, featuring singles from 1997 to 2002 and a few previously unreleased songs, including the hit single "Vampyre Girl." Sacrificial Etchings ranked as the 18th top album of 2003 in South Africa.

Darker Than Silence
Nyte released his third solo album, Sinister Swing, in 2003. A year later, Nyte began to work on The Awakening's most ambitious album by far, Darker Than Silence, with lyrical themes about devastation and medication. Songs such as "One More Crucifixion", "Angelyn", and "The Needle and the Gun" achieved a positive reception worldwide  and notable success on South African and German charts. The success brought The Awakening to tour the United States for the first time in 2004.

In July 2005, Nyte released his fourth solo album, Headspace with his solo band Ashton Nyte and the Accused.

Razor Burn
In 2006 Nyte signed a management deal with German-based MCM Music, and later signed a record deal with German label Massacre Records. The Awakening then released a seventh studio album, Razor Burn. With the European distribution and marketing of Massacre Records, the album received more notice than previous albums and positive reviews from alternative music press. Intervention Arts distributed the album to South African and US markets. A second US tour followed.

In late 2007, Nyte relocated to the US following a third US tour. The Awakening performed one of its first 2008 US shows as a headliner of HM Magazine's stage at Cornerstone Festival 2008. Nyte's fifth solo album, The Valley, was released in South Africa in October 2008 and in the US in June 2010.

Tales of Absolution and Obsoletion
In 2009, The Awakening completed another US tour promoting the eighth studio album, Tales of Absolution and Obsoletion released June 2009. The live tour lineup included gothic fashion designer Rose Mortem on piano and keyboards, who married Nyte the same year. The album was described as the "most theatrical and dramatic yet."

Anthology XV
On 15 February 2013, Nyte announced on The Awakening's official website that there would be a release of a new anthology compilation titled Anthology XV, featuring two new songs as well as remixes, reworkings, and updated versions of The Awakening's most well-known songs. Anthology XV was released in April 2013 and a multi-date South African tour is scheduled for March–April 2014. A new studio album was also planned for release in 2017.

Music
The Awakening's music has evolved since its early years. While Risen strongly emphasizes an older school of guitar-driven gothic rock, Request embraced electronics and the 1980s new romantic movement. "Ethereal Menace" started the age of "dark-future-rock"—which is, as Nyte describes, "a hybrid of hard electronics and chunky guitars, with a strong dance floor undercurrent." Nyte himself states David Bowie and Kate Bush as his "personal heroes" yet points out that his musical taste is "very broad".

Like many other artists who prefer to create under a band name, The Awakening is "the creative brainchild of Ashton Nyte." Since its inception, the band has had a different live lineup for each tour but no permanent band members. Unless otherwise indicated, all album instrumentation, vocals and lyrics are written and performed by Nyte, who describes his goals of live performance as "a ritual-type experience based on theatrical on-stage appearance and performance." He further describes the "elements of passion, beauty, poetry and theatrics" as the cornerstones of live shows.

Discography

Studio albums
 Risen (1997)
 Request (1998)
 Ethereal Menace (1999)
 The Fourth Seal of Zeen (2000)
 Roadside Heretics (2002)
 Darker Than Silence (2004)
 Razor Burn (2006)
 Tales of Absolution and Obsoletion (2009)
 Chasm (2018)
 This Alchemy (2021)
 The Passage Remains (2022)

EP's
 The March (1999)
 Sentimental Runaways (1999)
 The Fountain (1999)

Compilation albums
 Sacrificial Etchings (2003)
 Anthology XV (2013)

Compilation appearances
 5FM SA Music Explosion 1 EMI
 Dark Awakening COP International
 Unquiet Grave 2 Cleopatra Records
 Orgazmatracks 2 David Gresham Records
 Moonlight Cathedral Cold Fusion
 Orgazmatracks 3 Alter Ego
 CMA Radio Sampler Volume 5 CMA
 Zillo Magazine Sampler (multiple appearances)
 Orkus Club Hits(multiple appearances)
 HM Magazine Sampler (multiple appearances)
 The Doors Nightclub David Gresham Records

Television
SABC:
 Geraas
 SA City Life
 Replay
 Top Billing
 The Works

DSTV:
 Go!
 MK89

M-NET:
 Live @ 5

MTV Europe:
 Alternative Nation

References

External links
The Awakening official website
The Awakening official Facebook page

South African gothic rock groups
South African alternative rock groups
Dark rock groups